Charaxes amycus is a butterfly in the family Nymphalidae. It was described by Cajetan Felder and Rudolf Felder in 1861. It is endemic to the Philippines in the Indomalayan realm.

Description
Charaxes amycus is a large butterfly (wingspan 60– 68 mm.) The upperside ground colour is coppery rufous. There is a broad brown marginal band on the forewings and two tails on each hindwing.

Subspecies
C. a. amycus (Philippines: Luzon)
C. a. georgius Staudinger, 1892 (Philippines: Mindoro)
C. a. carolus Rothschild, 1900 (Philippines: Mindanao, Camiguin de Mindanao)
C. a. myron Fruhstorfer, 1914 (Philippines: Polillo, Guimaras)
C. a. negrosensis Schröder & Treadaway, 1982 (Philippines: Negros)
C. a. bayani Schröder & Treadaway, 1982 (Marinduque)
C. a. theobaldo Schröder & Treadaway, 1982 (Philippines: Panay)
C. a. marion Schröder & Treadaway, 1981 (Philippines: Sibuyan, Romblon Group)

References

External links
Charaxes Ochsenheimer, 1816 at Markku Savela's Lepidoptera and Some Other Life Forms

amycus
Butterflies described in 1861
Butterflies of Asia
Taxa named by Baron Cajetan von Felder
Taxa named by Rudolf Felder